Kotakoli Air Base  is a military airport at Kotakoli, a town in the Nord-Ubangi Province, Democratic Republic of the Congo.

See also

Transport in Democratic Republic of the Congo
List of airports in Democratic Republic of the Congo
Air Force of the Democratic Republic of the Congo

References

External links
 
 OpenStreetMap - Kotakoli Air Base
 Google Maps - Kotakoli

Airports in the Nord-Ubangi Province
Military of the Democratic Republic of the Congo
Nord-Ubangi